is a railway station on the Takayama Main Line in the city of Gero, Gifu Prefecture, Japan, operated by Central Japan Railway Company (JR Central).

Lines

Station layout
Zenshōji Station has one ground-level side platform serving a single bi-directional track. The station is unattended.

Adjacent stations

History
Zenshōji Station opened on May 5, 1931. The station was absorbed into the JR Central network upon the privatization of Japanese National Railways (JNR) on April 1, 1987.

Surrounding area
Hida River

See also
 List of Railway Stations in Japan

External links

Timetable (JR Central) 

Railway stations in Gifu Prefecture
Takayama Main Line
Railway stations in Japan opened in 1931
Stations of Central Japan Railway Company
Gero, Gifu